Deviant is an album by the British industrial metal band Pitchshifter, released in 2000. It was a follow up to the commercially successful album www.pitchshifter.com, but was seen by the record label as a disappointment. Promotional videos by DOSE Productions were made for the tracks "Hidden Agenda" and "Dead Battery". The track "Everything's Fucked" was originally released as "Everything Sucks". Jello Biafra makes an appearance on the track "As Seen on TV". By March 2002, the album had sold 33,000 copies in the U.S., just over half the amount www.pitchshifter.com had sold at the same time.

Before Deviant was released, a promotional sampler CD was released under the name 'Deviant Sampler'.

Track listing

Album cover 
Pitchshifter's album cover used a picture of a painting by Gee Vaucher, who did artwork for Crass and Carcass. The painting shows a cross between the Pope John Paul II and Queen Elizabeth II. The album cover was banned in Poland, due to some of the public's response and complaints deeming the image offensive and insulting to the Pope. The band and MCA Records apologized and changed the artwork.

Personnel

Pitchshifter
 J.S. Clayden – vocals, programming, engineering
 Jim Davies – guitars
 Mark Clayden – bass

Additional musicians
 John Stanier - additional live drums
 Jello Biafra – additional vocals (8)

Technical personnel
 Johnny Carter – additional programming, engineering
 Annette Cisneros – engineering
 Elan Trujillo – assistant engineering
 Steve Duda – additional programming, additional editing
 Bryan "Dewey" Hall – guitar technician
 The Drum Doctor – drum technician
 Sarah Debord – studio assistance
 Tony Santiago – studio assistance
 Chris Jensen – studio assistance
 Eddie Schreyer – mastering
 Gee Vaucher – front cover original black and white painting
 Howard – cover painting manipulation
 Dave Willis – band photos
 Tony Woolliscroft – band photos
 The Huja Brothers – "Rat Bastard" comic

References

Pitchshifter albums
2000 albums
MCA Records albums
Albums produced by Dave Jerden

pt:Pitchshifter#Discografia